Jyler Noviello (born December 22, 1984 in Wilmington, North Carolina) is an American soccer player who most recently played for Wilmington Hammerheads in the USL Professional Division. Noviello is currently coaching with the Penn Fusion Soccer Academy.

Career

College
Noviello grew up in Atlanta, Georgia, attended North Cobb High School where he school records for goals in a season (34), career goals (52), goals in a game (6) and assists in a game (4), and played one season of college soccer at South Georgia College before transferring to West Virginia University as a sophomore. At West Virginia he was a member of 2003 all-region team and the 2004 NSCAA all-south team.

In 2006 Noviello also played a season in the USL Premier Development League with the Atlanta Silverbacks U23's, and was his team's top scorer.

Professional
Noviello turned professional in 2008 when he joined the Wilmington Hammerheads in the USL Second Division. He made his professional debut on May 17, 2008 as a substitute in a 1–1 tie with the Harrisburg City Islanders.

He gained a certain amount of notoriety at Wilmington when he scored a spectacular goal from the right wing in a game against the Pittsburgh Riverhounds in June 2008.

After spending the 2010 season with Real Maryland Monarchs, Noviello returned to Wilmington Hammerheads for 2011 when he signed with the club on March 7, 2011.

Honors

Wilmington Hammerheads
USL Second Division Regular Season Champions (1): 2009

References

External links
 Penn State coaching profile
 Wilmington Hammerheads bio
 WVU bio

1984 births
Living people
American soccer players
West Virginia Mountaineers men's soccer players
Atlanta Silverbacks U23's players
Wilmington Hammerheads FC players
Real Maryland F.C. players
USL Second Division players
USL League Two players
USL Championship players
Association football forwards
Penn State Nittany Lions men's soccer coaches
American soccer coaches
Soccer players from Atlanta
South Georgia State College alumni
Team Wellington players
American expatriate sportspeople in New Zealand
Expatriate association footballers in New Zealand
American expatriate soccer players